South al-Mutlaa is new city under construction in Jahra Governorate, northern Kuwait. It is the largest housing project in the Kuwaiti history, ultimately intended to provide homes for 400,000 people in 12 suburbs, together with schools, mosques, mini-markets and health-centres. The city was approximately 39% complete by May 2019, and is expected to be completed by 2023. South al-Mutlaa is one of several new cities planned by the Kuwaiti government, alongside South Saad Al Abdullah and South Sabah Al Ahmad.

See also
 Madinat al-Hareer
 Sheikh Jaber Al-Ahmad Al-Sabah Causeway
 Sabah Al Ahmad Sea City
 Mubarak Al Kabeer Port
 Kuwait National Cultural District

References 

Belt and Road Initiative
Areas of Kuwait
Geography of Kuwait
Foreign relations of Kuwait
Foreign relations of China
Chinese investment abroad
History of Kuwait